The Kernighan–Lin algorithm is a heuristic algorithm for finding partitions of graphs.
The algorithm has important practical application in the layout of digital circuits and components in electronic design automation of VLSI.

Description
If the graph is unweighted, then instead the goal is to minimize the number of crossing edges; this is equivalent to assigning weight one to each edge. After matching the vertices, it then performs a subset of the pairs chosen to have the best overall effect on the solution quality .
Given a graph with  vertices, each pass of the algorithm runs in time . 

In more detail, for each , let  be the internal cost of a, that is, the sum of the costs of edges between a and other nodes in A, and let  be the external cost of a, that is, the sum of the costs of edges between a and nodes in B. Similarly, define ,  for each . Furthermore, let 

be the difference between the external and internal costs of s. If a and b are interchanged, then the reduction in cost is

where  is the cost of the possible edge between a and b.

Pseudocode
Source:

 function Kernighan-Lin(G(V, E)) is
     determine a balanced initial partition of the nodes into sets A and B
     
     do
         compute D values for all a in A and b in B
         let gv, av, and bv be empty lists
         for n := 1 to |V| / 2 do
             find a from A and b from B, such that g = D[a] + D[b] − 2×c(a, b) is maximal
             remove a and b from further consideration in this pass
             add g to gv, a to av, and b to bv
             update D values for the elements of A = A \ a and B = B \ b
         end for
         find k which maximizes g_max, the sum of gv[1], ..., gv[k]
         if g_max > 0 then
             Exchange av[1], av[2], ..., av[k] with bv[1], bv[2], ..., bv[k]
     until (g_max ≤ 0)
 
     return G(V, E)

See also
 Fiduccia–Mattheyses algorithm

References

Combinatorial optimization
Combinatorial algorithms
Heuristic algorithms